Steven Ray Bieser (born August 4, 1967) is an American former professional baseball catcher and outfielder, who is the current head baseball coach of the Missouri Tigers. He played college baseball at Jefferson College and Southeast Missouri State before playing professionally from 1989 to 2001. He then served as head coach of the Southeast Missouri State Redhawks (2013–2016).

Amateur career
Bieser was not highly regarded as a prospect when he graduated from high school, where he played for the Ste. Genevieve Dragons, and after graduation he enrolled at Jefferson College, a junior college in Missouri.  Jefferson's coach, David Oster, enjoyed a good reputation as an instructor, having coached seven players who made the Major Leagues (including Bieser) and having been selected to the National Junior College Baseball Hall of Fame in 2005. One season at Jefferson College and one season at Mineral Area College under Hal Loughary helped Bieser improve enough to make the team at Southeast Missouri State University.

Professional career
After the end of Bieser's college career, the Philadelphia Phillies chose him in the 32nd round of the 1989 June draft, with the 818th overall pick. Very few players chosen that low in the draft advance to the major leagues, but Bieser defied the odds. He advanced to AAA within the Phillies' organization, and after signing with the New York Mets as a six-year minor league free agent, made his major league debut on April 1, 1997.

Bieser appeared in 47 games with the Mets that year, chiefly as a bench player. His left-handed bat, above-average foot speed, and ability to play multiple positions helped him stay on the roster for a large portion of the season, as these traits afforded manager Bobby Valentine an unusual variety of tactical options. As a further testament to his versatility as a player, Bieser also filled in as a pitcher in minor league games during at least six different seasons.

At the end of the year, he signed with the Pittsburgh Pirates as a free agent, and in 1998 he appeared in 13 games with that franchise. He finished his major league career with a .250 batting average, a .351 on-base percentage, and a .300 slugging percentage in 80 at bats. Continuing to play professionally after the end of his time in the majors, Bieser last appeared in uniform as a player with the Memphis Redbirds in 2001.

Coaching career
After his last game as a player, Bieser has become a high school baseball coach at St. John Vianney High School, a private Catholic school in Kirkwood, Missouri.  His squad won the state championship in 2004.  His team has again claimed the state championship in 2006.  As of 2009 Steve Bieser was 117–42 in 6 seasons with the Vianney Griffins. Bieser also worked at the school as a math teacher. He left the position in 2010 for an assistant coaching position at Southeast Missouri State, where he was named the head coach prior to the 2013 season.

In 2009, Bieser was the manager of the Danville Dans, a team in the collegiate Prospect League.

Bieser coached the Southeast Missouri State Redhawks from 2013–16, leading them to 3 consecutive first-place finishes in the Ohio Valley Conference.

On June 30, 2016, the University of Missouri announced Bieser as its 14th baseball head coach, with a contract through 2021.

In his first three seasons, 2017-2019, Missouri had a record of 103-65-1, and a conference record of 39-50-1, its best three-year period since joining the SEC in 2013.

In 2019, Missouri extended his contract through the 2024 season.

Head coaching record
Below is a table of Bieser's yearly records as an NCAA head baseball coach.

See also
List of current NCAA Division I baseball coaches

References

External links
A partial listing of Bieser's professional statistics.

1967 births
Living people
Altoona Curve players
American expatriate baseball players in Canada
Baseball coaches from Missouri
Baseball players from Missouri
Batavia Clippers players
Clearwater Phillies players
Jefferson Vikings baseball players
Major League Baseball catchers
Major League Baseball center fielders
Major League Baseball left fielders
Memphis Redbirds players
Missouri Tigers baseball coaches
Nashville Sounds players
New York Mets players
Norfolk Tides players
Ottawa Lynx players
People from Perryville, Missouri
People from Ste. Genevieve, Missouri
Pittsburgh Pirates players
Reading Phillies players
Scranton/Wilkes-Barre Red Barons players
Southeast Missouri State Redhawks baseball coaches
Southeast Missouri State Redhawks baseball players
Spartanburg Phillies players